The Kaliningrad Constituency (No.97) is a Russian legislative constituency in Kaliningrad Oblast. Until 2007 Kaliningrad Oblast had a single constituency but its received a second one in 2016 redistricting. Since 2016 Kaliningrad constituency covers parts of Kaliningrad and northern Kaliningrad Oblast.

Members elected

Election results

1993

|-
! colspan=2 style="background-color:#E9E9E9;text-align:left;vertical-align:top;" |Candidate
! style="background-color:#E9E9E9;text-align:left;vertical-align:top;" |Party
! style="background-color:#E9E9E9;text-align:right;" |Votes
! style="background-color:#E9E9E9;text-align:right;" |%
|-
|style="background-color:#E9E26E"|
|align=left|Yury Voyevoda
|align=left|Russian Democratic Reform Movement
|
|20.31%
|-
|style="background-color:#0085BE"|
|align=left|Oleg Gordov
|align=left|Choice of Russia
| -
|20.15%
|-
| colspan="5" style="background-color:#E9E9E9;"|
|- style="font-weight:bold"
| colspan="3" style="text-align:left;" | Total
| 
| 100%
|-
| colspan="5" style="background-color:#E9E9E9;"|
|- style="font-weight:bold"
| colspan="4" |Source:
|
|}

1995

|-
! colspan=2 style="background-color:#E9E9E9;text-align:left;vertical-align:top;" |Candidate
! style="background-color:#E9E9E9;text-align:left;vertical-align:top;" |Party
! style="background-color:#E9E9E9;text-align:right;" |Votes
! style="background-color:#E9E9E9;text-align:right;" |%
|-
|style="background-color:"|
|align=left|Vladimir Nikitin
|align=left|Independent
|
|19.20%
|-
|style="background-color:"|
|align=left|Yury Voyevoda (incumbent)
|align=left|Independent
|
|14.08%
|-
|style="background-color:#23238E"|
|align=left|Nikolay Tulayev
|align=left|Our Home – Russia
|
|9.52%
|-
|style="background-color:"|
|align=left|Aleksandr Zhenatov
|align=left|Communist Party
|
|8.95%
|-
|style="background-color:"|
|align=left|Gennady Vatutin
|align=left|Agrarian Party
|
|4.99%
|-
|style="background-color:"|
|align=left|Dmitry Slepokurov
|align=left|Yabloko
|
|4.80%
|-
|style="background-color:#CE1100"|
|align=left|Aleksandr Orlov
|align=left|My Fatherland
|
|4.06%
|-
|style="background-color:#F21A29"|
|align=left|Vladimir Kuzmenok
|align=left|Trade Unions and Industrialists – Union of Labour
|
|3.98%
|-
|style="background-color:#2C299A"|
|align=left|Boris Shushkin
|align=left|Congress of Russian Communities
|
|3.07%
|-
|style="background-color:"|
|align=left|Aleksandr Savostikov
|align=left|Independent
|
|2.74%
|-
|style="background-color:"|
|align=left|Valery Starikov
|align=left|Independent
|
|2.34%
|-
|style="background-color:"|
|align=left|Leonid Romadin
|align=left|Independent
|
|1.77%
|-
|style="background-color:"|
|align=left|Sergey Zhuravsky
|align=left|Independent
|
|1.32%
|-
|style="background-color:#1C1A0D"|
|align=left|Vladimir Vysokovsky
|align=left|Forward, Russia!
|
|1.27%
|-
|style="background-color:"|
|align=left|Valery Krashenko
|align=left|Independent
|
|1.21%
|-
|style="background-color:"|
|align=left|Gennady Snustikov
|align=left|Independent
|
|0.85%
|-
|style="background-color:"|
|align=left|Vyacheslav Orlenok
|align=left|Independent
|
|0.83%
|-
|style="background-color:#000000"|
|colspan=2 |against all
|
|12.46%
|-
| colspan="5" style="background-color:#E9E9E9;"|
|- style="font-weight:bold"
| colspan="3" style="text-align:left;" | Total
| 
| 100%
|-
| colspan="5" style="background-color:#E9E9E9;"|
|- style="font-weight:bold"
| colspan="4" |Source:
|
|}

1999

|-
! colspan=2 style="background-color:#E9E9E9;text-align:left;vertical-align:top;" |Candidate
! style="background-color:#E9E9E9;text-align:left;vertical-align:top;" |Party
! style="background-color:#E9E9E9;text-align:right;" |Votes
! style="background-color:#E9E9E9;text-align:right;" |%
|-
|style="background-color:"|
|align=left|Vladimir Nikitin (incumbent)
|align=left|Independent
|
|29.16%
|-
|style="background-color:"|
|align=left|Sergey Medvedev
|align=left|Independent
|
|15.97%
|-
|style="background-color:"|
|align=left|Andrey Krayny
|align=left|Independent
|
|10.00%
|-
|style="background-color:#3B9EDF"|
|align=left|Sergey Kozlov
|align=left|Fatherland – All Russia
|
|6.41%
|-
|style="background-color:"|
|align=left|Vitaly Lednik
|align=left|Unity
|
|6.05%
|-
|style="background-color:"|
|align=left|Vladimir Shumeyko
|align=left|Independent
|
|4.84%
|-
|style="background-color:"|
|align=left|Nikolay Tulayev
|align=left|Independent
|
|3.51%
|-
|style="background-color:"|
|align=left|Valery Seleznev
|align=left|Liberal Democratic Party
|
|3.01%
|-
|style="background-color:#E98282"|
|align=left|Galina Fomenko
|align=left|Women of Russia
|
|2.82%
|-
|style="background-color:"|
|align=left|Dmitry Slepokurov
|align=left|Yabloko
|
|2.28%
|-
|style="background-color:"|
|align=left|Vladimir Popov
|align=left|Independent
|
|1.93%
|-
|style="background-color:#FF4400"|
|align=left|Viktor Kazakov
|align=left|Andrey Nikolayev and Svyatoslav Fyodorov Bloc
|
|1.03%
|-
|style="background-color:"|
|align=left|Andrey Kubanov
|align=left|Independent
|
|0.65%
|-
|style="background-color:"|
|align=left|Yury Voyevoda
|align=left|Independent
|
|0.63%
|-
|style="background-color:#23238E"|
|align=left|Pavel Doronin
|align=left|Our Home – Russia
|
|0.59%
|-
|style="background-color:#FCCA19"|
|align=left|Vladimir Voblikov
|align=left|Congress of Russian Communities-Yury Boldyrev Movement
|
|0.57%
|-
|style="background-color:#084284"|
|align=left|Vyacheslav Bogdanov
|align=left|Spiritual Heritage
|
|0.47%
|-
|style="background-color:"|
|align=left|Valery Sychev
|align=left|Independent
|
|0.17%
|-
|style="background-color:#000000"|
|colspan=2 |against all
|
|8.18%
|-
| colspan="5" style="background-color:#E9E9E9;"|
|- style="font-weight:bold"
| colspan="3" style="text-align:left;" | Total
| 
| 100%
|-
| colspan="5" style="background-color:#E9E9E9;"|
|- style="font-weight:bold"
| colspan="4" |Source:
|
|}

2003

|-
! colspan=2 style="background-color:#E9E9E9;text-align:left;vertical-align:top;" |Candidate
! style="background-color:#E9E9E9;text-align:left;vertical-align:top;" |Party
! style="background-color:#E9E9E9;text-align:right;" |Votes
! style="background-color:#E9E9E9;text-align:right;" |%
|-
|style="background-color:"|
|align=left|Vladimir Nikitin (incumbent)
|align=left|Independent
|
|22.10%
|-
|style="background-color:"|
|align=left|Aleksandr Datsyshin
|align=left|United Russia
|
|18.57%
|-
|style="background-color:#DBB726"|
|align=left|Vitautas Lopata
|align=left|Democratic Party
|
|14.50%
|-
|style="background-color:"|
|align=left|Yury Shitikov
|align=left|Independent
|
|7.84%
|-
|style="background-color:"|
|align=left|Valery Seleznev
|align=left|Liberal Democratic Party
|
|5.97%
|-
|style="background-color:#00A1FF"|
|align=left|Irina Kuznetsova
|align=left|Party of Russia's Rebirth-Russian Party of Life
|
|5.42%
|-
|style="background-color:#1042A5"|
|align=left|Lyudmila Zelinskaya
|align=left|Union of Right Forces
|
|4.22%
|-
|style="background-color:"|
|align=left|Vasily Kovalchuk
|align=left|Yabloko
|
|2.67%
|-
|style="background-color:#004090"|
|align=left|Aleksey Yushenkov
|align=left|New Course — Automobile Russia
|
|0.97%
|-
|style="background-color:#14589F"|
|align=left|Yakov Kuzin
|align=left|Development of Enterprise
|
|0.65%
|-
|style="background-color:#164C8C"|
|align=left|Aleksey Zernov
|align=left|United Russian Party Rus'
|
|0.60%
|-
|style="background-color:#000000"|
|colspan=2 |against all
|
|14.69%
|-
| colspan="5" style="background-color:#E9E9E9;"|
|- style="font-weight:bold"
| colspan="3" style="text-align:left;" | Total
| 
| 100%
|-
| colspan="5" style="background-color:#E9E9E9;"|
|- style="font-weight:bold"
| colspan="4" |Source:
|
|}

2016

|-
! colspan=2 style="background-color:#E9E9E9;text-align:left;vertical-align:top;" |Candidate
! style="background-color:#E9E9E9;text-align:left;vertical-align:top;" |Party
! style="background-color:#E9E9E9;text-align:right;" |Votes
! style="background-color:#E9E9E9;text-align:right;" |%
|-
|style="background-color:"|
|align=left|Aleksandr Pyatikop
|align=left|United Russia
|
|38.95%
|-
|style="background-color:"|
|align=left|Igor Revin
|align=left|Communist Party
|
|13.76%
|-
|style="background-color:"|
|align=left|Yegor Anisimov
|align=left|Liberal Democratic Party
|
|13.11%
|-
|style="background:"| 
|align=left|Natalya Masyanova
|align=left|A Just Russia
|
|8.24%
|-
|style="background:"| 
|align=left|Mikhail Chesalin
|align=left|Patriots of Russia
|
|6.34%
|-
|style="background:"| 
|align=left|Aleksandr Orlov
|align=left|Communists of Russia
|
|4.83%
|-
|style="background:"| 
|align=left|Dmitry Potapenko
|align=left|Party of Growth
|
|4.16%
|-
|style="background-color:"|
|align=left|Dmitry Novik
|align=left|Rodina
|
|2.79%
|-
|style="background: "| 
|align=left|Vitaly Goncharov
|align=left|The Greens
|
|2.30%
|-
| colspan="5" style="background-color:#E9E9E9;"|
|- style="font-weight:bold"
| colspan="3" style="text-align:left;" | Total
| 
| 100%
|-
| colspan="5" style="background-color:#E9E9E9;"|
|- style="font-weight:bold"
| colspan="4" |Source:
|
|}

2021

|-
! colspan=2 style="background-color:#E9E9E9;text-align:left;vertical-align:top;" |Candidate
! style="background-color:#E9E9E9;text-align:left;vertical-align:top;" |Party
! style="background-color:#E9E9E9;text-align:right;" |Votes
! style="background-color:#E9E9E9;text-align:right;" |%
|-
|style="background-color:"|
|align=left|Andrey Kolesnik
|align=left|United Russia
|
|37.77%
|-
|style="background-color:"|
|align=left|Maksim Bulka
|align=left|Communist Party
|
|18.44%
|-
|style="background-color:"|
|align=left|Semyon Kurbatov
|align=left|Liberal Democratic Party
|
|10.81%
|-
|style="background-color: " |
|align=left|Aleksandr Konstantinov
|align=left|A Just Russia — For Truth
|
|8.13%
|-
|style="background-color: "|
|align=left|Igor Revin
|align=left|Party of Pensioners
|
|7.70%
|-
|style="background-color: "|
|align=left|Vitautas Lopata
|align=left|Yabloko
|
|5.70%
|-
|style="background-color: "|
|align=left|Gennady Ustimenko
|align=left|Russian Party of Freedom and Justice
|
|2.90%
|-
|style="background-color: "|
|align=left|Andrey Raudsep
|align=left|Rodina
|
|2.18%
|-
| colspan="5" style="background-color:#E9E9E9;"|
|- style="font-weight:bold"
| colspan="3" style="text-align:left;" | Total
| 
| 100%
|-
| colspan="5" style="background-color:#E9E9E9;"|
|- style="font-weight:bold"
| colspan="4" |Source:
|
|}

Notes

References

Russian legislative constituencies
Politics of Kaliningrad Oblast